The 1979 St. Louis Cardinals season was the franchise's 60th year with the National Football League and its 20th season in St. Louis. Bud Wilkinson would be fired in Week 13 after starting 3–10; Larry Wilson, a Pro Football Hall of Fame safety for the Cardinals from 1960 to 1972, would take over as interim head coach and lead the Cardinals to a 2–1 record to finish the season. Wilson would not return for the 1980 season but would return as vice president and General Manager nine years later when the Cardinals had moved to Phoenix.

Offseason

NFL Draft

Personnel

Staff

Roster

Regular season
In his NFL debut, Ottis Anderson had 193 rushing yards.

Schedule

Note: Intra-division opponents are in bold text.

Standings

Awards and records
 Ottis Anderson, Associated Press Offensive Rookie of the Year

Milestones

References

Cardinals on Pro Football Reference
Cardinals on jt-sw.com

St. Louis
Arizona Cardinals seasons